Gabriele Paonessa (born 18 April 1987) is an Italian footballer.

Biography
On 10 June 2010 Parma F.C. announced that they had swapped Daniele Paponi for Paonessa, both half card was tagged for €600,000. Both club retained 50% registration rights of the player. Bologna made a profit of €1,140,500 for Paonessa which registered in 2009–10 financial year, but at the same time created a cost of amortization for €1.2 million, spreading from 2010–11 to 2014–15.

Paonessa signed a 5-year contract. From 2010 to 2013 he was loaned to various club, such as Cesena in 2010 and Crotone on 31 January 2013. Crotone also received €100,000 from Parma as premi di valorizzazione. The co-ownership deals were terminated in June 2012. Since 2013 Paonessa failed to find a club to play, despite under contract with Parma until 30 June 2017. He earned just €70,000 in 2010–11 season.

International career
He made his U-21 team debut against Luxembourg U-21, 12 December 2006, replacing Simone Bentivoglio in the 71st minute and scored his debut goal on the 83rd.

References

External links
Profile in Vicenza Calcio site 

Italian footballers
Parma Calcio 1913 players
Bologna F.C. 1909 players
L.R. Vicenza players
A.C. Cesena players
S.S.C. Napoli players
U.S. Avellino 1912 players
A.S. Gubbio 1910 players
Association football forwards
Italy under-21 international footballers
Serie B players
Serie C players
Footballers from Bologna
1987 births
Living people